This article lists various records and statistics of Pakistan national field hockey team.

Honors 

 Olympics
 Winners (3):  1960, 1968, 1984
 Runner-up (3):  1956, 1964, 1972
 Third place (2):  1976, 1992
 Fourth place (3): 1948, 1952, 2000
 Hockey World Cup
 Winners (4):  1971, 1978, 1982, 1994
 Runner-up (2):  1975, 1990
 Fourth place (1): 1973
 Hockey Champions Trophy
 Winners (3):  1978, 1980, 1994
 Runner-up (7):  1983, 1984, 1988, 1991, 1996, 1998, 2014
 Third place(7):  1986, 1992, 1995, 2002, 2003, 2004, 2012
 Fourth place (7): 1981, 1982, 1985, 1989, 1990, 1993, 2001
 Asian Games
 Winners (8):  1958, 1962, 1970, 1974, 1978, 1982, 1990, 2010
 Runner-up (3):  1966, 1986, 2014
 Third place (3):  1994, 1998, 2006
 Fourth place (2): 2002, 2018
 Hockey Asia Cup
 Winners (3):  1982, 1985, 1989
 Runner-ups (3): 1999, 2003, 2009
 Third place (3):  1994, 2013, 2017

Individual records

Appearances

Most Appearances 
As of 18 September 2021 following the players with most caps for Pakistan

Players in bold are still active

Goalscorers

Most goalscorers 
As of 18 September 2021 following the players with at least fifty goals for Pakistan

Players in bold are still active

Other Records 

 First goal: Ali Iqtidar Shah Dara, 2 August 1948,  vs Belgium
 Most goals in a match: Aziz Malik, 3 August 1948,  vs Denmark

 Olympic Records
 Most goals at the Olympics: Sohail Abbas, 22 goals (2000-2012)
 Most goals at a single Olympic: Sohail Abbas, 11 goals (2004)
 Most goals in an Olympic match: Aziz Malik, 3 August 1948,  vs Denmark
 Hockey World Cup Records
 Most goals at the World Cup: Sohail Abbas, 18 goals (1998-2010)
 Most goals at a single World Cup: Hassan Sardar (1982) and Sohail Abbas (2002), 10 goals each
 Most goals in a World Cup match: Hassan Sardar, 2 January 1982,  vs New Zealand
 Hockey Champions Trophy Records
 Most goals at the Champions Trophy: Sohail Abbas, 41 goals (1998-2011)
 Most goals at a single Champions Trophy: Sohail Abbas, 9 goals (2003)
 Most goals in a Champions Trophy match: 
 Hanif Khan, 3 January 1980,  vs India
 Samiullah Khan, 6 January 1980,  vs Australia
 Musaddiq Hussain, 17 November 1990,  vs Germany
 Tahir Zaman, 22 November 1990,  vs Soviet Union
 Musaddiq Hussain, 1 September 1991,  vs Soviet Union
 Sohail Abbas, 7 November 2001,  vs Germany
 Kashif Jawad, 10 November 2001,  vs England
 Asian Games Records
 Most goals at the Asian Games: Abdul Waheed Khan, 25 goals (1962-1966)
 Most goals at a single Asian Game: Abdul Waheed Khan, 17 goals (1962)
 Most goals in an Asian Games match: Shahnaz Sheikh, 15 December 1978,  vs Bangladesh
 Hockey Asia Cup Records
 Most goals at the Asia Cup: Sohail Abbas, 24 goals (1999-2009)
 Most goals at a single Asia Cup: Hassan Sardar (1982) and Sohail Abbas (1999), 16 goals each
 Most goals in an Asian Cup match: Rahim Khan,  9 November 1993,  vs Thailand

Team records

Biggest victory

By margin

By opponents 
List of biggest victories by opponents with at least 20 matches played

Most consecutive wins

Biggest defeat

Most consecutive winless streak 

Field hockey in Pakistan